Malka Madusanka (born 19 October 1995) is a Sri Lankan cricketer. He made his first-class debut for Sri Lanka Army Sports Club in the 2017–18 Premier League Tournament on 15 December 2017.

References

External links
 

1995 births
Living people
Sri Lankan cricketers
Sri Lanka Army Sports Club cricketers
Place of birth missing (living people)